Q70 may refer to:

 Q70 (New York City bus), a bus route in New York City
 Al-Maarij, the 70th surah of the Quran
 
 Infiniti Q70, a sport sedan
 Samsung Sens Q70, a notebook computer